Panzhihua Iron and Steel (Group) Company Limited, or Pangang, is the state-owned enterprise in Panzhihua, Sichuan, China. It is the largest steel maker in Western China. It is also the largest vanadium product manufacturer in China, and the second largest in the world. It has three subsidiaries listed on the Shenzhen Stock Exchange and they are Panzhihua New Steel and Vanadium, Changcheng Special Steel and Chongqing Titanium. In total, the firm has eight subsidiaries and associates, who are engaged in smelting, processing and distributing iron and steel as well as vanadium products (as of December 31, 2010).

External links
Panzhihua Iron and Steel (Group) Limited

References

Steel companies of China
Government-owned companies of China
Companies based in Sichuan
Manufacturing companies established in 1965
Chinese companies established in 1965
1965 establishments in China